68109 Naomipasachoff, provisional designation , is a background asteroid from the inner regions of the asteroid belt, approximately 3.5 kilometers in diameter. It was discovered on 17 December 2000, by astronomers of the LONEOS program at the Anderson Mesa Station near Flagstaff, Arizona, in the United States. The asteroid was named after American biographer and research associate, Naomi Pasachoff.

Orbit and classification 

Naomipasachoff is a non-family from the main belt's background population. It orbits the Sun in the inner asteroid belt at a distance of 2.2–2.7 AU once every 3 years and 11 months (1,418 days; semi-major axis of 2.47 AU). Its orbit has an eccentricity of 0.10 and an inclination of 9° with respect to the ecliptic.

The body's observation arc begins with a precovery taken at Lincoln Laboratory ETS in March 1998, more than 2 years prior to its official discovery observation at Anderson Mesa.

Naming 

This minor planet was named by LONEOS-astronomer Edward Bowell after American biographer and research associate, Naomi Pasachoff (born 1947), who has written several scientific biographies. Her published work includes biographies of Marie Curie, Alexander Graham Bell, Niels Bohr, Isaac Newton, Albert Einstein, Linus Pauling. She is also an amateur astronomer. The official naming citation was published by the Minor Planet Center on 6 January 2007.

Physical characteristics

Rotation period 

As of 2018, no rotational lightcurve of Naomipasachoff has been obtained from photometric observations. The body's rotation period, pole and shape remain unknown.

Diameter and albedo 

According to the survey carried out by the NEOWISE mission of NASA's Wide-field Infrared Survey Explorer, Naomipasachoff measures 3.581 kilometers in diameter and its surface has an albedo of 0.218. Based on its albedo and its location in the inner asteroid belt, Naomipasachoff is possibly a common, stony S-type asteroid.

References

External links 
 Naomi Pasachoff at Williams College
 Asteroid Lightcurve Database (LCDB), query form (info )
 Dictionary of Minor Planet Names, Google books
 Asteroids and comets rotation curves, CdR – Observatoire de Genève, Raoul Behrend
 Discovery Circumstances: Numbered Minor Planets (65001)-(70000) – Minor Planet Center
 
 

068109
068109
Named minor planets
20001217